Jyoti Bhushan Pratap Singh Law College (known as JBPS Law College) is a law school located in Korba, Chhattisgarh, India. It was established in 2006, it is affiliated to Bilaspur University and approved by Bar Council of India (BCI).

History
Established in 2006, it was affiliated to Guru Ghasidas University, Bilaspur. In 2012, the college became affiliated to newly formed Bilaspur University.

Location
JBPS Law College is located in Rani Road, Korba along with Kamla Nehru College, Korba in same campus.

Courses
JBPS Law College offers Bachelor of Law (LL.B).

See also
Kamla Nehru College, Korba
Durga Mahavidyalaya, Raipur

References

Universities and colleges in Chhattisgarh
Colleges affiliated to Atal Bihari Vajpayee Vishwavidyalaya
Korba, Chhattisgarh
Educational institutions established in 2006
2006 establishments in Chhattisgarh